Surrey United may refer to:
Surrey United (basketball), an English basketball team
Surrey United Firefighters, a Canadian soccer team